Mirosław Żuławski (16 January 1913 – 17 February 1995) was a Polish writer, prosaist, diplomatist and screenwriter. He was father of film director, Andrzej Żuławski.

Biography
Mirosław Żuławski was born in Nisko. He graduated in law and diplomatic studies from Lviv University. His career as a poet began in Sygnały magazine in 1934. During World War II he was a soldier of Związek Walki Zbrojnej, and then Armia Krajowa. In AK Żuławski operated in cultural underground and also wrote newsletters. During the years of 1944 and 1945 he was a war correspondent. After that he became as an editor-in-chief's assistant of Rzeczpospolita newspaper.

In 1945–1952 and 1957–1978 Żuławski worked in diplomacy as a permanent deputy of Poland in UNESCO in Paris. He was an ambassador of People's Republic of Poland (PRL) in Senegal and Mali. He was an editor of Przegląd Kulturalny weekly magazine from 1952 to 1957. Through the 1990s Żuławski published feuilletons in Twój Styl.

He died in 1995 in Warsaw.

Honours 

 Order of Polonia Restituta, Third Class
 Order of Polonia Restituta, Fourth Class
 Order of the Cross of Grunwald, Third Class (1946)
 Legion of Honour, Fourth Class
 National Order of Merit, Third Class
 Labor Order, First Class
 National Order of the Lion

Notable works
 , stories, 1947
 , 1947
 , novel, 1953
 , 1954
 , 1954
 , 1956
 , 1965
 , 1970
 , feuilletons, 1973 (extended edition in 1976)
 , 1997
 , memories, 1983-1989

Screenplays
  (a.k.a. The Bus Leaves at 6.20), script consultation, 1954
  (a.k.a. The Atlantic Tale), based on his own story, 1955
  (a.k.a. The Story of Triumphant Love), 1967
 , 1967
  (a.k.a. The Third Part of the Night), 1971

Family tree

References

External links

 Album domowe 
 Mirosław Żuławski at Filmweb 

1913 births
1995 deaths
People from Nisko
Ambassadors of Poland to Mali
Polish male novelists
Ambassadors of Poland to Senegal
20th-century Polish novelists
20th-century Polish male writers
Commanders of the Order of Polonia Restituta
Officers of the Order of Polonia Restituta
Recipients of the Order of the Cross of Grunwald, 3rd class
Commanders of the Ordre national du Mérite
Officiers of the Légion d'honneur
Polish United Workers' Party members
University of Lviv alumni
Home Army members
20th-century Polish screenwriters
Male screenwriters
20th-century Polish journalists
Recipients of the State Award Badge (Poland)
Diplomats of the Polish People's Republic
Recipients of orders, decorations, and medals of Senegal